Krishna Palai (born 10 November 1999) is an Indian cricketer. He made his List A debut for Odisha in the 2018–19 Vijay Hazare Trophy on 28 September 2018.

References

External links
 

1999 births
Living people
Indian cricketers
Odisha cricketers
Cricketers from Odisha
People from Rourkela